Saint-Odilon-de-Cranbourne is a municipality in Beauce-Centre Regional County Municipality the Chaudière-Appalaches region of Quebec, Canada. Its population is 1,407 as of the Canada 2021 Census. The municipality's name honours Reverend Pierre-François-Xavier-Odilon-Marie-Alphonse Paradis, first priest of Saint-Odilon-de-Cranbourne, while "Cranbourne" comes from Cranborne, a village in East Dorset, England.

Demographics 

Notable people 
 Simon Nolet, a former National Hockey League player
 Prosper-Edmond Lessard, (1873-1931) Alberta provincial politician and Senator

References

External links
Saint-Odilon-de-Cranbourne 

Municipalities in Quebec
Incorporated places in Chaudière-Appalaches